Raygorod is a rural locality (a khutor) in Svetloyarsky District, Volgograd Oblast, Russia. The population was 2,848 as of 2010. There are 45 streets.

Geography 
Raygorod is located 15 km northwest of Svetly Yar (the district's administrative centre) by road. Svetly Yar is the nearest rural locality.

References 

Rural localities in Svetloyarsky District